The National Oceanic and Atmospheric Administration Pacific Islands Fleet is one of the three fleets of the United States' National Oceanic and Atmospheric Administration (NOAA).

Organization

NOAA Pacific Islands Fleet is headquartered at NOAA Marine Operations Center – Pacific Islands in Honolulu, Hawaii, and is charged with undertaking NOAA missions in the Western Pacific Ocean.

Ships
The smallest of the NOAA fleets, as of March 2016, two ships were assigned to the Pacific Islands Fleet: NOAAS Oscar Elton Sette and NOAAS Hi'ialakai.

See also
 NOAA Commissioned Officer Corps
 United States Seventh Fleet

References

National Oceanic and Atmospheric Administration